= DUXAP8 =

Identifiers
- Aliases: DUXAP8, double homeobox A pseudogene 8
- External IDs: GeneCards: DUXAP8; OMA:DUXAP8 - orthologs

Gene location (Human)
Chr.	Chromosome 22 (human)
Band	22q11.1	Start	15,784,959 bp
Band	22q11.1	End	15,829,984 bp
Orthologs
Species	Human	Mouse
Entrez	503637	n/a
Ensembl	ENSG00000206195	n/a
UniProt	n a	n/a
RefSeq (mRNA)	n/a	n/a
RefSeq (protein)	n/a	n/a
Location (UCSC)	Chr 22: 15.78 – 15.83 Mb	n/a
PubMed search		n/a
- Wikidata
View/Edit Human

Double homeobox A pseudogene 8 is a protein that in humans is encoded by the DUXAP8 gene.

== Function ==
Homeobox genes encode DNA-binding proteins, many of which are thought to be involved in early embryonic development. Homeobox genes encode a DNA-binding domain of 60 to 63 amino acids referred to as the homeodomain. This pseudogene is a member of the DUXA homeobox gene family.
